The U.S. state of Vermont first required its residents to register their motor vehicles and display license plates in 1905. , plates are issued by the Vermont Department of Motor Vehicles (DMV), associated with the Vermont Agency of Transportation. Front and rear plates are required for most classes of vehicles, while only rear plates are required for motorcycles and trailers.

Passenger baseplates

1905 to 1966
The 1956 (dated 1957) issue was the first Vermont license plate that complied with these standards.

1967 to present

Non-passenger plates

References

External links
Vermont license plates, 1969–present

Vermont
Vermont transportation-related lists
Transportation in Vermont